The Mixed 4 × 200 metre freestyle relay competition of the 2020 European Aquatics Championships was held on 18 May 2021.

Records
Before the competition, the existing European and championship records were as follows.

The following new records were set during this competition.

Results

Heats
The heats were started at 10:57.

Final
The final was held at 19:27.

References

Mixed 4 x 200 metre freestyle relay
Mixed aquatics